The 2011 Rother District Council election took place on 5 May 2011 to elect members of Rother District Council in East Sussex, England. The whole council was up for election and the Conservative Party stayed in overall control of the council.

Election result
The Conservatives stayed in control of the council with a slightly reduced majority after having a net loss of 1 seat to leave them on 27 councillors. They lost 1 seat to Labour in Bexhill Sidley and 3 seats to independents, with all 4 independents who stood for seats in Bexhill being elected. However the Conservatives picked up a seat in Darwell, after independent councillor Wendy Mier stood down at the election, and gained 2 seats from the Liberal Democrats in Salehurst and Bexhill St Michaels.

The Liberal Democrats also lost a seat to Labour in Rye and as a result dropped from 8 to 5 seats on the council. Meanwhile, the Labour gains in Rye and Bexhill Sidley meant the party regained a presence on the council with 2 councillors. Overall turnout at the election was 48.2%, which was described as "exceptionally good" by the returning officer.

Ward results

By-elections between 2011 and 2015
A by-election was held in Darwell on 31 July 2014 after the resignation of Conservative councillor Bob White. The seat was held for the Conservatives by Eleanor Kirby-Green with a majority of 179 votes over the UK Independence Party.

References

2011
2011 English local elections
2010s in East Sussex